The grey-headed tanager (Eucometis penicillata) is a widely distributed species of small Neotropical bird in the tanager family Thraupidae. It is the only member of the genus Eucometis.

It is found in Central America and northern South America from Mexico to Brazil.
Its natural habitats are subtropical or tropical moist lowland forest, subtropical or tropical swamps, and heavily degraded former forest.

Taxonomy
The grey-headed tanager was formally described in 1825 by the German naturalist Johann Baptist von Spix under the binomial name Tanagra penicillata. Spix did not specify a type locality by this was later designated as Fonte Boa in the Brazilian state of Amazonas. The grey-headed tanager is now the only species placed in the genus Eucometis that was introduced by the English zoologist Philip Sclater in 1856. The genus name is derived from Ancient Greek eukomēs meaning "with lovely hair". The specific epithet penicillata is from the Latin diminutive of peniculus  meaning "brush".

Within the Thraupidae, the grey-headed tanager is a member of the subfamily Tachyphoninae and is the sister species to the black-goggled tanager in the monospecific genus Trichothraupis.

Seven subspecies are recognised:
 E. p. pallida Berlepsch, 1888 – southeast Mexico to Honduras
 E. p. spodocephalus (Bonaparte, 1853) – Nicaragua and north Costa Rica
 E. p. stictothorax Berlepsch, 1888 – west-central Costa Rica to west Panama
 E. p. cristata (Du Bus de Gisignies, 1855) – east Panama, north Colombia and northwest Venezuela
 E. p. affinis Berlepsch, 1888 – north Venezuela
 E. p. penicillata (Spix, 1825) – southeast Colombia, east Ecuador and east Peru east through the Guianas and north Brazil
 E. p. albicollis (d'Orbigny & Lafresnaye, 1837) – Bolivia and Paraguay through central Brazil

References

Further reading

External links
 Xeno-canto: audio recordings of the grey-headed tanager

grey-headed tanager
Birds of Central America
Birds of Colombia
Birds of Venezuela
Birds of the Guianas
Birds of the Amazon Basin
Birds of the Pantanal
grey-headed tanager
Birds of Brazil
Taxonomy articles created by Polbot